Shailesh Kumar Alias Bulo Mandal was a member of parliament from Bhagalpur (Lok Sabha constituency). He won the 2014 Indian general election being a Rashtriya Janata Dal candidate but lost in 2019 general election to his rival candidate Ajay Kumar Mandal. His birthplace is Raghopur.

References

Living people
India MPs 2014–2019
People from Bhagalpur district
Rashtriya Janata Dal politicians
Lok Sabha members from Bihar
1975 births